The 2021 Arab Women's Cup was the second edition of the Arab Women's Cup for national women's football teams affiliated with the Union of Arab Football Associations (UAFA). The tournament was hosted by Egypt between 24 August and 6 September 2021.

Hosts Egypt lost to eventual winners Jordan in the semi-finals. Jordan beat Tunisia 1–0 in the final.

Participating teams

 Bold indicates champion for that year. Italic indicates the hosts country.

Did not enter

Venues

Due to the COVID-19 pandemic in Egypt, all the matches were played behind closed doors without any spectators.

Squads

Match officials

Referees
 Lamia Athman (Algeria)  
 Shahanda Saad Al-Maghraby  (Egypt)  
 Haneen Murad (Jordan)
 Doumouh Al Bakkar (Lebanon)
 Bouchra Karboubi (Morocco)
 Dorsaf Ganouati (Tunisia)
 Khuloud Al-Zaabi (United Arab Emirates)

Assistant Referees
 Yara Atef (Egypt)
 Mona Atalla (Egypt)
 Sabreen Al-Abadi (Jordan)
 Perissa Nasr (Lebanon)
 Fatiha Jermouni (Morocco) 
 Heba Saadieh (Palestine)
 Roba Zarka (Syria)  
 Houda Afine (Tunisia)
 Amal Gamal Badhafari (United Arab Emirates)

Group stage

Group A

Group B

Knockout stage
In the knockout stage, extra-time and a penalty shoot-out were used to decide the winner if necessary.

Bracket

Semi-finals

Final

Statistics

Goalscorers

Final standings
Per statistical convention in football, matches decided in extra time are counted as wins and losses, while matches decided by penalty shoot-outs are counted as draws.

|-
| colspan="11"| Eliminated in the semi-finals
|-

|-
| colspan="11"| Eliminated in the group stage
|-

|}

Media

Broadcasting
From the knockout stage, the competition was covered by the Egyptian channel OnTime Sports.

See also
 2021 FIFA Arab Cup
 2021 Arab Cup U-20
 2021 Arab Cup U-17

References

 
2021
Arab Women's Cup
Arab Women's Cup
Arab
2021–22 in Egyptian football
International association football competitions hosted by Egypt